Margherita Gargano (born 18 November 1952 in Bagheria, Province of Palermo) is a former female middle distance runner from Italy.

Biography
She is best known for winning the gold medal at the 1979 Mediterranean Games in the women's 1,500 metres. Gargano set her personal best (4:06.71) in the 1,500 metres in 1979.

Personal bests
800m    2'03"1 (1979)- 2'06"3 indoor (1980)
1500m   4'06"71(1979)- 4'19"81 indoor (1983)
3000m   8'46"31 (1982)- 9'03"62 indoor (1982)
5000m   15'20"94 (1982)
10000m  35'01"4 (1976)

Achievements

See also
Italian all-time top lists - 5000 m

External links
 

1952 births
Living people
People from Bagheria
Italian female middle-distance runners
Athletes (track and field) at the 1976 Summer Olympics
Olympic athletes of Italy
Mediterranean Games gold medalists for Italy
Mediterranean Games medalists in athletics
Athletes (track and field) at the 1979 Mediterranean Games
Sportspeople from the Province of Palermo